A Trip is a 2011 Slovenian drama film directed by Nejc Gazvoda. The film was selected as the Slovenian entry for the Best Foreign Language Oscar at the 85th Academy Awards, but it did not make the final shortlist.

Cast
 Luka Cimpric as Andrej
 Jure Henigman as Gregor
 Nina Rakovec as Ziva

See also
 List of submissions to the 85th Academy Awards for Best Foreign Language Film
 List of Slovenian submissions for the Academy Award for Best Foreign Language Film

References

External links
 

2011 films
2011 drama films
Slovene-language films
Slovenian drama films